Leo Warren Jenkins (May 28, 1913 – January 14, 1989) was the sixth president and chancellor of what is now East Carolina University in Greenville, North Carolina, United States.

He was born in the Succasunna section of Roxbury, New Jersey and raised in Elizabeth, New Jersey. He attended Rutgers University, majoring in political science a masters from Columbia University and a doctorate from New York University. He enlisted in World War II as a marine, serving during the battle of Guam. Jenkins joined the faculty of East Carolina Teachers College in 1947 and served as Dean of the school until his election to the presidency in 1960. Under his watch, East Carolina gained university status in 1967. When ECU became part of the University of North Carolina System in 1972, Jenkins stayed on as chancellor, retiring in 1978. The Leo W. Jenkins Cancer Center at the Brody School of Medicine was named for him.

References

External links 
 East Carolina University Icons Gallery profile
 Leo Warren Jenkins Papers (#360), East Carolina Manuscript Collection, J. Y. Joyner Library, East Carolina University
 Leo W. Jenkins Oral History Interview (#OH0051), East Carolina Manuscript Collection, J. Y. Joyner Library, East Carolina University
 Leo W. Jenkins Papers. UA90-06. University Archives, East Carolina University

1913 births
1989 deaths
United States Marine Corps personnel of World War II
Columbia Graduate School of Arts and Sciences alumni
New York University alumni
People from Elizabeth, New Jersey
People from Roxbury, New Jersey
Presidents of East Carolina University
Rutgers University alumni
United States Marines
20th-century American academics